The Scout and Guide movement in the Dutch Caribbean is served by
Aruba 
see Scouting and Guiding on Aruba
Curaçao
 Padvindstersvereniging van de Nederlandse Antillen, member of the World Association of Girl Guides and Girl Scouts
 Scouting Antiano, member of the World Organization of the Scout Movement
Vereniging voor Oudpadvindsters "Copernicia", member of the International Scout and Guide Fellowship
 Independent Scouts of Curaçao, member of the World Federation of Independent Scouts
 Antilliaans Jongens & Meisjes Gilde, Curaçao
 Jeugd Luchtvaart Brigade, Curaçao
 Jonge Wacht Curaçao
Sint Maarten
 Scouting Antiano
 7th Day Adventists Pathfinders, St. Maarten
 Boys Brigade St. Maarten
 Girls Brigade St. Maarten
Bonaire
Scouting Antiano
Padvindstersvereniging van de Nederlandse Antillen
Sint Eustatius
 Boys Brigade St. Eustatius
 Garfield Pathfinders Club, St. Eustatius
 Girls Brigade St. Eustatius
Saba
 Sea Scouts Saba 
 Child Focus Foundation Saba (a variety of activities, including Sea Scouts)
 The Saba Girls and Boys Sports Society (originally Saba Girls and Boys Scouts)

See also

References

External links
Antillean Federation for Youth Care (FAJ), umbrella organization of children and youth organizations at all islands of the Netherlands Antilles.